Pierrefitte–Stains is an RER station in Pierrefitte-sur-Seine and near to Stains in the northern suburbs of Paris, in Seine-Saint-Denis department. The station is in Zone 4 of the Carte orange. It is situated on the RER D suburban railway line and The T11 Express.

External links
 
 

Railway stations in Seine-Saint-Denis
Réseau Express Régional stations